Shah Neshin Asiab Sar castle is a historical castle located in Behshahr County in Mazandaran Province, The longevity of this fortress dates back to the Early centuries of historical periods after Islam.

References 

Castles in Iran